Foreign broadcasting is broadcasting with a foreign element.

The foreign element may be the territory of the audience, its ethnicit], or both.
 Foreign country and ethnicity: an external service aimed at foreign societies in general. Its purpose may be information about the country of origin, about the target country from an outside point of view as well as missionary or commercial purposes.
 Foreign territory: an external service aimed at expatriates. A special audience among expatriates is armed forces personnel, for whom broadcasting is often done not only from the home country, but also from within the country of deployment.
 Foreign ethnicity: a service for foreign communities within the country of broadcasting (like migrants, refugees, tourists), which in turn is to be distinguished from broadcasting for indigenous and other non-foreign groups (see also Minority language broadcasting).

List of radio services
External and selected other foreign language audio broadcasting services

Bold: 10 major international broadcasting languages (Arabic, Chinese, English, French, German, Persian, Portuguese, Russian, Spanish, Turkish)
Italic: major language(s) of the respective country

List of TV services
Selected external and other foreign language TV services

References

Languages by country
Languages by country
Broadcasting